Philip III (27 March 1306 – 16 September 1343), called the Noble or the Wise, was King of Navarre from 1328 until his death. He was born a minor member of the French royal family but gained prominence when the Capetian main line went extinct, as he and his wife and cousin, Joan II of Navarre, acquired the Iberian kingdom and a number of French fiefs.

Philip and Joan's accession signified the end of the 44-year-long personal union between France and Navarre. Although neither succeeded in claiming the crown of France, Philip and Joan were powerful vassals of the Valois king Philip VI as well as successful co-monarchs in Navarre. Despite initial reluctance by the Navarrese to accept him as king alongside Joan, Philip in particular is credited with improving the kingdom's legislature. The couple resided chiefly in their French lands but spent enough time in Navarre to earn them substantial popularity in the country.

Philip actively supported his Valois cousin with his troops and as army leader, especially during the onset of the Hundred Years' War. During his joint reign with his wife, however, the focus of Navarre again shifted to its Iberian neighbours. This may have influenced Philip to join the crusade against the Kingdom of Granada, during which he fell ill, possibly wounded, and died.

Capetian succession 

Philip was the son of Louis, Count of Évreux, a younger son of King Philip III of France by his second wife, Marie of Brabant. Philip's father was the founder of the Capetian House of Évreux, while his mother, Margaret (d. 1311), belonged to another Capetian branch, the House of Artois. The House of Évreux was closely involved in negotiations about the succession of Philip's first cousin, King Louis X of France. At the time of his sudden death in 1316, Louis X's only child was a four-year-old daughter, Joan, which presented a problem because no Capetian king had ever died sonless. Joan's maternal family, the Capetian House of Burgundy, claimed the crown on her behalf, but her paternal uncle succeeded instead as King Philip V. Her uncle also displaced her in succession to the Kingdom of Navarre, which had only recently come into Capetian hands through Queen Joan I of Navarre, the mother of Philip V and Louis X.

Philip V was eventually pressured to renegotiate his niece's status. An agreement reached on 27 March 1318 included territorial concessions which placated Joan's maternal family, as well as her betrothal to Philip of Évreux, a dowry and a promise of succession to the counties of Champagne and Brie (also Joan I of Navarre's patrimony) if King Philip V were to die sonless. Philip's marriage to Joan was celebrated on 18 June, after which she lived with his grandmother Queen Marie. A dispensation had been sought because Joan was only six years old. Although they lived near each other, Philip and Joan were not raised together due to age difference. Their union was not consummated until 1324.

Philip inherited the fief of Évreux in Normandy upon his father's death in 1319. As Philip was a minor, his uncle Charles of Valois (d. 1325) was appointed his guardian.

King Philip V died sonless in 1322 and all his patrimony passed to his and King Louis X's younger brother, King Charles IV, who married Philip's sister Joan in 1325. When Charles too died leaving no sons on 1 February 1328, the direct male line of the House of Capet came to an end. With the bypassing first of Philip of Évreux's wife and then of Philip V's daughters, the principle of agnatic succession had become established. Philip of Évreux and his namesake cousin, Philip of Valois, were the strongest Capetian candidates for the throne, while King Edward III of England claimed it as Charles IV's sororal nephew. The 15-year-old Edward's claim was dismissed, and the 35-year-old Philip of Valois was preferred over the 23-year-old Philip of Évreux on account of his more mature age. The House of Valois thus ascended the throne in the person of Philip VI, who immediately took Philip of Évreux on his council. The Valois had no right to the Kingdom of Navarre or the French counties of Champagne and Brie, however, as they were not descended from Joan I. Philip VI could not allow the Évreux couple to take possession of Champagne and Brie since that, coupled with their holdings in Normandy, would give them a powerbase encircling his capital at Paris. Philip and Joan thus ceded these lands to the Valois in return for the counties of Angoulême, Mortain and Longueville.

Accession as king 

The death of Charles, Joan's younger uncle, in February 1328 paved the way for Philip's accession to the throne of Navarre, as there was no longer anyone who could challenge the couple's right to it. The Navarrese, uncomfortable with repressive governors appointed from Paris, were pleased to see the personal union with France come to an end. They held a general assembly in March and again in May, recognizing Philip's wife as their sovereign. The ascension of the House of Évreux under Philip III is thus important as beginning of a new era in the history of Navarre, now once again free from the government of France.

While Joan's hereditary right to the crown was universally recognized by the Estates, Philip's future role was not clear. Joan alone was invited to the capital Pamplona to assume government on her uncle's death. Philip was entirely ignored but determined to assert his own authority. The spouses negotiated with the Estates separately in July, and on 22 August Pope John XXII issued a bull confirming Philip as King of Navarre. Of particular concern was Philip's role in the forthcoming coronation. The Estates insisted that Joan alone, as "the natural lady", would be raised on the shield and crowned and that "no one can be raised up if they are not the natural lord". They nevertheless agreed to allow Philip to take part in the government. Philip was dissatisfied, believing that his position would be undermined if he were not crowned alongside Joan. The couple's legates invoked the New Testament in support of Philip's rights as "husband and head", while also stressing that Joan as sovereign wished him to be crowned and to have more power as her co-ruler.

In the end, both Joan and Philip were crowned, anointed by bishop Arnalt de Barbazan and raised on the shield in Pamplona Cathedral on 5 March 1329. Philip and Joan were the first monarchs of Navarre to be crowned. The use of crowns and sceptres was an innovation in Navarrese royal ceremony, borrowed from Capetian tradition. Although they came to form part of the ceremonial of the subsequent Évreux monarchs, these elements had no significance to the Navarrese in 1329, to whom the oath was the essential act.

In May 1329, Philip and Joan signed a charter which emphasised repeatedly that she was the "true and natural heir" of Navarre, but that "all of the kingdom of Navarre would obey her consort under the name of king". Philip's role in securing his wife's smooth acquisition of the kingdom was also acknowledged. In order to limit Philip's involvement, however, it was stipulated that both he and Joan would renounce the crown as soon as their heir, male or female, reached the age of 21, or they were obliged to pay a fine of 100,000 livres tournois. Placing a limitation on the monarchs' reign was an unprecedented and extraordinary condition.

Domestic policy 

Grandson of a king but raised with the expectation of being merely a count, Philip took kingship seriously. He was completely unprepared for the role but succeeded, all whilst counselling the newly enthroned King of France, in learning within a few months everything he need to know about his new kingdom, its people, language and institutions.

Philip III proved to be an effective and successful ruler. His most famous achievement was the improvement of the kingdom's law code in 1330. In September 1331 he and Joan moved back to France; they returned to Navarre in April 1336 and stayed in the kingdom until October 1337. Altogether, Philip III and Joan II stayed in the kingdom longer than any Navarrese monarch since 1274. The couple spent most of their time in their various French fiefs and in their Parisian palace, from where they were able to further their positions as French princes of the blood, but Philip ensured their visibility in Navarre during several visits. He even visited the kingdom on his own on several occasions, while its "natural lady" administered his own counties in France.

Philip III and Joan II's joint reign was marked by their close cooperation, but he prevailed in legislation and several other fields of government. Forty-one surviving royal decrees were issued in the names of both Philip and Joan, but Philip signed thirty-eight without referring to his wife, while only six were issued in Joan's name alone. The couple ensured that the Navarrese customs and laws were respected and that the kingdom's citizens were more directly involved in governance. Their active involvement in the administration of Navarre despite their absences, as well as putting the interests of Navarre ahead of those of their French homeland, earned them praise by both their contemporaries and by historians.

Economic development projects undertaken by Philip and Joan include the construction of an irrigation system in the arid fields of Tudela in the south of their kingdom, reparation of castles and erection of a new one in Castelrenault. The king and queen were also determined to ensure the enforcement of law in their realm, condemning the perpetrators of anti-Jewish riots that took place before their arrival and assigning compensation to the victims. A particular problem for them was banditry, which they strove to address at the onset of their reign. Their dedication to serving justice led the chroniclers to depict them as "a good king and queen and well loved by all in their kingdom".

In 1338, Philip confiscated the lands of Mixe and Ostabarret to the crown. These lands had long belonged to the viscounts of Tartas in Guyenne, who did homage for them to the king of Navarre. In 1338, the old viscount, Guitard d'Albret, died, leaving Bernard Ezi IV, lord of Albret, his successor. He refused to do homage to Philip, who sent Juan de Rosas, castellan of Saint-Jean-Pied-de-Port to occupy Garris, the chief town of Mixe, and administer the territory as the king's bailiff. The nobility of the region apparently resented the royal action, and in September a small army of 200 troops under Guillem Arnalt de Irumberri was sent to restore order. Philip attached the lands and their revenues to the royal domain.

Foreign relations 

In August 1328, Philip, only recently recognised as King of Navarre, joined the King of France in the suppression of a peasant revolt in Flanders. At the battle of Cassel on 23 August, the international force assisting Philip VI, was divided into ten batailles, with the French king himself commanding the fifth. He was joined by thirty-nine banners in his bataille, among them that of Philip III.

Thereafter, Navarre's foreign policy during the reign of Philip III and Joan II shifted again towards Iberia. Though they remained entangled in French politics, the couple were keen to build closer relations with the neighbouring kingdoms of Aragon and Castile. From 1329 to 1333 they negotiated a marital alliance with Aragon; their eldest child and heir presumptive, a daughter named Joan, was to marry King Peter IV of Aragon. During the negotiations, however, two sons, Louis and Charles, were born to the couple and displaced the prospective bride in the succession. She eventually became a nun. The alliance with Aragon was nevertheless concluded in 1338 when Peter married Philip and Joan's second daughter, Marie.

From 1328 until 1331 Philip III of Navarre and Philip VI of France corresponded with Alfonso XI of Castile about a crusade against the Kingdom of Granada, but action was postponed due to the French king's reluctance. On 1 October 1333, Pierre-Roger, then Archbishop of Rouen, preached a crusading sermon before an assembly of noblemen in the presence of Philip VI in Paris. After the sermon, the King of France took the cross and, along with the King of Navarre, the Duke of Brabant, the Duke of Burgundy and the Duke of Bourbon, vowed to go on a "holy voyage overseas" to restore the Kingdom of Jerusalem. This crusade was finally to be directed against Granada, but owing to instability in Europe was delayed indefinitely with papal approval on 13 March 1336.

In late June 1335, while Philip was in France, Navarre suffered the first of a series of violations of its border by Castile that escalated into war by October. Although neither Philip nor Alfonso had provoked hostilities, the latter felt bound to lead his army against Navarre. Philip sent the archbishop of Reims, Jean de Vienne, to negotiate a peace, which Alfonso was quick to agree. On 28 February 1336 at Las Cuevas, a peace treaty was signed. Navarre had received military assistance from Gaston II, Count of Foix, and after the war Philip ordered his treasury to compensate the count.

Succession to the French throne proved to be far from settled by Philip of Valois's accession. In 1337 Edward III of England decided to claim France as the closest male relative of Charles IV. In December 1339, during the opening stages of the Hundred Years' War, Philip III of Navarre reinforced the garrison of Tournai in anticipation of an English siege. He was at the side of Philip VI of France and the kings allied with him, John of Bohemia and David II of Scotland, for the war's first campaign, when French king lifted the sieges of Cambrai (8 October 1339) and Tournai (25 September 1340).

Crusade and death 
Philip returned to Navarre in 1342 and again in 1343, partly in preparation for joining the crusade against the Muslim state of Granada. He likely felt this was his duty as ruler of an Iberian kingdom. Philip's authorities ensured that his own Muslim subjects in Tudela were not disturbed by his crusading army. Philip arrived at the siege of Algeciras in July 1343 with 100 knights and 300 infantrymen, but more important than this small military force was the large quantity of provisions—meat, barley, bacon and wine—which he had sent from the Bay of Biscay. When Gaston II of Foix, an ally of Navarre in the war of 1335, abandoned the siege in late August, he tried unsuccessfully to convince Philip to leave as well.

In early September Philip fell ill, after being wounded by an arrow according to some reports. Alfonso XI offered him his own doctors, who advised Philip to change his diet. The King of Navarre, however, preferred the advice of his own doctor, who told him to keep eating meat and wine and to withdraw from the siege. He obediently withdrew, but got no further than Jerez de la Frontera, where he died on 16 September 1343. His body was brought back to Pamplona for burial, though his heart was buried at the now-demolished church of the Couvent des Jacobins in Paris. His widow, Joan, received a letter of condolences from Pope Clement VI (the former Pierre-Roger) in November. Algeciras fell in March 1344. Joan continued to reign alone until her death in 1349, when the crown passed to their eldest surviving son, Charles II.

Family

Unlike the well-documented marriages of their Capetian predecessors, no evidence attests to Philip and Joan's personal relationship. This indicates that their marriage was marked neither by particular closeness nor difficulty. They were very rarely apart, however, and had nine children together.

Joan (c. 1326–1387), nun at Longchamps
Maria (c. 1329 – 1347), first wife of Peter IV of Aragon
Louis (1330–1334)
Blanche (1331–1398), second wife of Philip VI of France
Charles II the Bad (1332–1387), successor, Count of Évreux and King of Navarre
Philip, Count of Longueville (c. 1333–1363), married Yolande de Dampierre
Agnes (1334–1396), married Gaston III, Count of Foix
Louis (1341–1376), Count of Beaumont-le-Roger, married firstly Maria de Lizarazu and secondly Joanna, Duchess of Durazzo
Joan (aft 1342–1403), married John I, Viscount of Rohan

Family tree

References

Bibliography 

 
 
 
 
 
 
 

 
 
 
 
 
 
 

 
 
 
 
 
 
 

1306 births
1343 deaths
14th-century Navarrese monarchs
14th-century peers of France
House of Évreux
Jure uxoris kings
Counts of Évreux
Counts of Angoulême
People of the Hundred Years' War
People of the Reconquista